Merr or MERR may refer to:

Maine Eastern Railroad, former railroad in coastal Maine
Merr., taxonomic author abbreviation of Elmer Drew Merrill (1876–1956), American botanist and taxonomist

See also
G.Merr., taxonomic author abbreviation of George Knox Merrill
Mer (disambiguation)